Dead Cert is a 1974 British crime thriller film directed by Tony Richardson. It is an adaptation of the 1962 novel of the same name by Dick Francis.

Plot
In this film based on Dick Francis' mystery novel, Alan York (Scott Antony) is stunned when his dear friend, skilled jockey Bill Davidson (Ian Hogg) is killed during a simple steeplechase. Convinced Davidson's death was no accident, York begins an investigation with a suspicion that Davidson's racehorse, Admiral, was drugged in a murderous act of sabotage. Assisting him as he delves into this world of high stakes, horses and gambling is Davidson's devoted widow, Laura (Judi Dench).

Cast

References

External links
 
 
 

1974 films
1974 crime films
British crime films
Films based on British novels
Films directed by Tony Richardson
Films scored by John Addison
British horse racing films
United Artists films
1970s English-language films
1970s British films